The 2017 Australian motorcycle Grand Prix was the sixteenth round of the 2017 MotoGP season. It was held at the Phillip Island Grand Prix Circuit in Phillip Island on 22 October 2017.

Classification

MotoGP

Moto2 race report
Miguel Oliveira took his first victory in the Moto2 class and became the first Portuguese rider to win in the intermediate class. KTM took their first victory in Moto2, the first in the intermediate class since the 250cc 2008 British Grand Prix; this ended Kalex winning streak, which had started at the 2015 Argentine Grand Prix.

Moto2

Moto3
The race, scheduled to be run for 23 laps, was red-flagged on lap 16 due to a rain shower that fell on certain parts of the track. As the race already went through two-thirds of race distance, the race was stopped and the final results were taken at the end of the 15th lap and full points were awarded.

Championship standings after the race

MotoGP
Below are the standings for the top five riders and constructors after round sixteen has concluded.

Riders' Championship standings

Constructors' Championship standings

 Note: Only the top five positions are included for both sets of standings.

Moto2

Moto3

References

Australia
Motorcycle Grand Prix
Australian motorcycle Grand Prix
Australia
Motorsport at Phillip Island